Clay County is a county located in the southwestern part of the U.S. state of Georgia. As of the 2020 census, the population was 2,848, making it the fourth-least populous county in Georgia. The county seat is Fort Gaines.

History
This area was historically occupied by the Creek Indians until Indian Removal in the 1830s. European Americans pushed them out and developed the land for cotton, bringing in thousands of African slaves to work the land.

The county is named in honor of Henry Clay, famous American statesman, member of the United States Senate from Kentucky and United States Secretary of State in the 19th century. Part of the Black Belt geological formation of Georgia, prior to the American Civil War the county's chief commodity crop was cotton, cultivated and processed by farmers and African-American slaves. After the war, the economy continued to be agricultural, but timber was also harvested.

Clay was created by a February 16, 1854, act of the Georgia General Assembly, and organized from portions of Early and Randolph counties.

Clay County's population is one-third of what it was in 1910.

Geography

The central and southwestern portions of Clay County, from west of Bluffton to northwest of Coleman, are located in the Lower Chattahoochee River sub-basin of the ACF River Basin (Apalachicola-Chattahoochee-Flint River Basin). The county's northwestern corner, which is bisected by State Route 39 running north from Fort Gaines, is located in the Middle Chattahoochee River-Walter F. George Lake sub-basin of the same ACF River Basin. Just the very southeastern corner of Clay County is located in the Spring Creek sub-basin of the same larger ACF River Basin.

Major highways
  U.S. Route 27
  State Route 1
  State Route 37
  State Route 39
  State Route 266

Adjacent counties
 Quitman County - north
 Randolph County - northeast
 Calhoun County - east
 Early County - south
 Henry County, Alabama - west
 Barbour County, Alabama - northwest

Demographics

2020 census

As of the 2020 United States census, there were 2,848 people, 1,242 households, and 708 families residing in the county.

2010 census
As of the 2010 United States Census, there were 3,183 people, 1,331 households, and 869 families living in the county. The racial makeup of the county was 60.4% black or African American, 37.6% white, 0.3% Asian, 0.3% American Indian, 0.1% from other races, and 1.2% from two or more races. Those of Hispanic or Latino origin made up 0.8% of the population. In terms of ancestry, and 3.3% were American.

Of the 1,331 households, 27.3% had children under the age of 18 living with them, 37.5% were married couples living together, 22.8% had a female householder with no husband present, 34.7% were non-families, and 31.6% of all households were made up of individuals. The average household size was 2.35 and the average family size was 2.93. The median age was 45.8 years.

The median income for a household in the county was $26,250 and the median income for a family was $31,354. Males had a median income of $29,440 versus $23,816 for females. The per capita income for the county was $13,353. About 25.5% of families and 34.2% of the population were below the poverty line, including 56.7% of those under age 18 and 16.0% of those age 65 or over.

2000 census
As of the census of 2000, there were 3,357 people, 1,347 households, and 928 families living in the county.  The population density was 17 people per square mile (7/km2).  There were 1,925 housing units at an average density of 10 per square mile (4/km2).  The racial makeup of the county was 60.47% Black or African American, 38.43% White,  0.12% Native American, 0.27% Asian, 0.06% Pacific Islander, and 0.66% from two or more races.  0.95% of the population were Hispanic or Latino of any race.

There were 1,347 households, out of which 25.70% had children under the age of 18 living with them, 40.70% were married couples living together, 23.40% had a female householder with no husband present, and 31.10% were non-families. 27.80% of all households were made up of individuals, and 13.20% had someone living alone who was 65 years of age or older.  The average household size was 2.45 and the average family size was 2.99.

In the county, the population was spread out, with 25.70% under the age of 18, 8.00% from 18 to 24, 21.00% from 25 to 44, 25.70% from 45 to 64, and 19.50% who were 65 years of age or older.  The median age was 42 years. For every 100 females there were 83.30 males.  For every 100 females age 18 and over, there were 78.50 males.

The median income for a household in the county was $21,448, and the median income for a family was $27,837. Males had a median income of $26,557 versus $17,083 for females. The per capita income for the county was $16,819.  About 28.10% of families and 31.30% of the population were below the poverty line, including 43.40% of those under age 18 and 23.90% of those age 65 or over.

Education

Communities

Cities
 Bluffton
 Fort Gaines

Unincorporated communities
 Pecan
 Suttons Corner
 Zetto

Ghost town
 Oketeyeconne

Politics
Clay County is one of the most consistently Democratic counties in the country. It voted for the Democratic nominee in every election from 1868 until 1960, and then again since 1976.

See also

 National Register of Historic Places listings in Clay County, Georgia
List of counties in Georgia

References
General

Specific
 Georgia Snapshots - Clay County
 GeorgiaInfo Clay County Courthouse history

External links
 Official Website of Clay County Georgia
 Clay County historical marker
 New Lowell United Methodist Church historical marker

 
1854 establishments in Georgia (U.S. state)
Georgia (U.S. state) counties
Populated places established in 1854
Black Belt (U.S. region)
Majority-minority counties in Georgia